The Abgarid dynasty was a dynasty of Nabataean Arab origin. Members of the dynasty, the Abgarids, reigned between 134 BC and 242 AD over Edessa and Osroene in Upper Mesopotamia. Some members of the dynasty bore Iranian names, while others had Arab names, including Abgar itself. J.B. Segal notes that the names ending in "-u" are "undoubtedly Nabatean". The Abgarid dynasts spoke "a form of Aramaic". 

Following the Battle of Carrhae (53 BC), members of the dynasty pursued a broadly pro-Parthian policy for about two centuries. At the turn of the 2nd century AD, the Romans turned Osroene into a Roman client state. During Caracalla's reign (198–217), most likely in 214, Abgar IX Severus was deposed and Osroene was incorporated as a Roman province (colonia). Thereafter, Abgarid dynasts only ruled in name. Abgar X Frahad, the last nominal Abgarid ruler, settled in Rome together with his wife.

Kings

References

Sources
 
 
 

Arab dynasties
Kings of Osroene
Edessa